The West Point Grade School is a historic former school on East 3300 South in the village of West Point in Gooding County near Wendell, Idaho.  It was listed on the National Register of Historic Places in 1982.

It was built in 1941 by general contractor R. C. Fait to designs by prominent Boise architects Tourtellotte & Hummel.  It is a vaguely classical design with Art Deco influences, and is the "sole, and therefore exceptionally important, institutional and architectural focus of this somewhat out-of-the-way farm community immediately north of the Snake River in south-central Idaho".

In 1982 the building was occupied as a Grange Hall, but its current use is unknown.

References

School buildings on the National Register of Historic Places in Idaho
School buildings completed in 1941
Buildings and structures in Gooding County, Idaho
National Register of Historic Places in Gooding County, Idaho